The canton of Cancale is a former canton of France, located in the arrondissement of Saint-Malo, in the Ille-et-Vilaine département, Brittany région. It had 16,254 inhabitants (2012). It was disbanded following the French canton reorganisation which came into effect in March 2015.

Composition
The canton comprised the following communes:
 Cancale ;
 La Fresnais ;
 Hirel ;
 Saint-Benoît-des-Ondes ;
 Saint-Coulomb ;
 Saint-Méloir-des-Ondes.

Election results

Between 2011 and 2015, the canton of Cancale was represented in the general council of Ille-et-Vilaine department by DVG councillor Maurice Jannin, Mayor of Cancale.

2004

References

Former cantons of Ille-et-Vilaine
2015 disestablishments in France
States and territories disestablished in 2015